U.S. Route 34 (US 34) is an east–west United States highway that runs for  from north-central Colorado to the western suburbs of Chicago. Through Rocky Mountain National Park it is known as the Trail Ridge Road where it reaches elevation , making it the third highest paved through highway in the United States. The highway's western terminus is Granby, Colorado at US 40. Its eastern terminus is in Berwyn, Illinois at Illinois Route 43 and Historic US 66.

U.S. Route 34 becomes a toll road for a short distance  in Colorado, where it passes through Rocky Mountain National Park.

Route description

Colorado

In the state of Colorado, U.S. Route 34 runs north from Granby through Rocky Mountain National Park. It passes through Estes Park, Loveland, and Greeley before entering Nebraska east of Wray.

Within Rocky Mountain National Park US 34 is known as Trail Ridge Road. Due to its high elevation through the park and over the Continental Divide, Route 34 closes entirely in winter from the Colorado River Trailhead on the west (10 miles north of the Grand Lake entrance) to Many Parks Curve on the east (8 miles from the Estes Park entrance.) Closure runs roughly from mid-October to Memorial Day weekend in May, and can occur at any time in summer due to high alpine snow storms.

Route 34 transverses Fall River Pass and Milner Pass in the Front Range of Colorado.

Nebraska

In the state of Nebraska, U.S. Route 34 is a major east–west arterial surface road along the southern portion of Nebraska. It enters Nebraska west of Haigler and overlaps other routes for the majority of its routing. U.S. 34 passes through Hastings, Grand Island, Seward, and Lincoln before entering Iowa between Plattsmouth and Bellevue.

U.S. Route 34 from between Hastings and Grand Island is known as the Tom Osborne Expressway, which is named for the former Hastings resident, Nebraska Cornhuskers football coach, and Congressman.  In Lincoln, U.S. 34 overlaps with Interstate 180 from its junction with Interstate 80 into downtown where it becomes North 9th/North 10th Streets, then east as "O" Street.  Also, the segment from the Lancaster County/Cass County border to Nebraska Highway 1 south of Elmwood is the Bess Streeter Aldrich Memorial Highway, after the former author and Elmwood resident.

Iowa

In the state of Iowa, U.S. Route 34 is a major east–west arterial surface road across southern Iowa. It enters Iowa west of Glenwood and  then passes through Glenwood, Red Oak, Corning, and Creston before intersecting Interstate 35 at Osceola.  East of Osceola, it continues through Chariton and Georgetown then onto Albia before meeting U.S. Route 63 at a traffic circle in Ottumwa.

East of Ottumwa to Burlington, the highway overlaps Iowa Highway 163. This segment of highway is an expressway with some freeway segments. As of November 12, 2008, it bypasses Fairfield and then bypasses Mt. Pleasant, with a portion of this also concurrent with US-218 and Iowa 27, which is also the Iowa route for the Avenue of the Saints. It then continues southeast towards Burlington bypassing New London and then Danville and Middletown. The freeway segment through Burlington was completed in the 1970s. It then crosses the Mississippi River on the Great River Bridge into Illinois which was completed in the early 1990s. In 2015, a 15-mile segment of U.S. Route 34 in Montgomery and Adams counties won the Sheldon G. Hayes Award for the highest quality asphalt pavement in the nation.

Much of this route was originally known as the Bluegrass Highway and parallels tracks of what was originally the Burlington and Missouri River Railroad and is now the BNSF.  Amtrak's California Zephyr passenger rail service also parallels this route.

U.S. 34 in the state of Iowa is officially designated the Red Bull Highway in honor of the 34th Infantry (Red Bull) Division.

Illinois

In the state of Illinois, U.S. Route 34 enters at the Mississippi River across from Burlington, Iowa. It passes through or around the cities of Monmouth, Galesburg, Princeton, Mendota, Yorkville, Oswego, Aurora, Naperville, Lisle, Downers Grove, Westmont, Clarendon Hills, Hinsdale, Western Springs,  La Grange, Brookfield, Lyons and Riverside and continues in a largely southwest-northeast direction to its eastern terminus at Illinois Route 43 and Historic US 66 in Berwyn. Through much of the Chicago area, the highway is known as "Ogden Avenue", after William Butler Ogden, Chicago's first mayor.  The entire highway in Illinois is named the Walter Payton Memorial Highway after Pro Football Hall of Famer Walter Payton, who wore #34 for the Chicago Bears. The highway is 211.37 miles (340.17 km) long within the state.

Major intersections
Colorado
  in Granby
  in Deer Ridge Junction
  in Estes Park
  in Loveland
  in Loveland
  in Evans. The highways travel concurrently to Greeley.
  northeast of Wiggins. The highways travel concurrently to west-southwest of Log Lane Village.
  in Wray
Nebraska
  west of Culbertson. The highways travel concurrently to Hastings.
  in McCook. The highways travel concurrently through the city.
  in Arapahoe
  north-northwest of Edison
  in Holdrege
  in Hastings. The highways travel concurrently to Grand Island.
  south of Grand Island
  in York. The highways travel concurrently to north of York.
  in Lincoln. I-180/US 34 travels concurrently through the city.
  east of Union. The highways travel concurrently to north-northwest of La Platte.
Iowa
  north-northwest of Pacific Junction. US 34/US 275 travels concurrently to east-southeast of Glenwood.
  north of Emerson
  north of Villisca
  in Afton. The highways travel concurrently to west of Thayer.
  in Osceola
  in Osceola
  in Lucas. The highways travel concurrently through the city.
  in Ottumwa. The highways travel concurrently to east of Ottumwa.
  north of Mt. Pleasant. The highways travel concurrently to Mt. Pleasant.
  in Burlington
Illinois
  south-southwest of Monmouth. The highways travel concurrently to Monmouth.
  in Galesburg
  in Galesburg
  west of Sheffield. The highways travel concurrently to Princeton.
  in Mendota
  east of Mendota
  on the Oswego–Montgomery city line. The highways travel concurrently one block.
  on the Lisle–Downers Grove city line
  on the Hinsdale–Western Springs city line
  in La Grange
  on the Riverside–Lyons–Berwyn city line

Related routes
Special routes of U.S. Route 34

References

External links

Endpoints of U.S. Highway 34
Ogden Avenue history and photography at Forgotten Chicago.
Image of new Missouri River bridge under construction

 
United States Numbered Highway System
Ronald Reagan Trail